Chaminda Wijayakumara Vidanapathirana (born January 25, 1983, in Morawake) is a Sri Lankan cricketer. A right-arm fast-medium bowler, he plays for the Singhalese Sports Club and has represented his country at the under-23 level.

See also
Cricket in Sri Lanka

References

External links
 

1983 births
Living people
Sinhalese Sports Club cricketers
Sri Lankan cricketers
21st-century Sri Lankan people